The 1991 NAIA women's basketball tournament was the 11th annual tournament held by the NAIA to determine the national champion of women's college basketball among its members in the United States and Canada.

Fort Hays State defeated defending champions Southwestern Oklahoma State in the championship game, 57–53, to claim the Tigers' first NAIA national title.

The tournament was played at the Oman Arena in Jackson, Tennessee.

Qualification

The tournament field remained expanded for the second time in its history, increasing from sixteen to thirty-two teams. The top sixteen teams received seeds. 

The tournament continue to utilize a simple single-elimination format.

Bracket

See also
1991 NCAA Division I women's basketball tournament
1991 NCAA Division II women's basketball tournament
1991 NCAA Division III women's basketball tournament
1991 NAIA men's basketball tournament

References

NAIA
NAIA Women's Basketball Championships
1991 in sports in Tennessee